Franklin Township is one of fifteen townships in Surry County, North Carolina, United States. The township had a population of 2,155 according to the 2000 census. The township was named for the family of Jesse Franklin, a former governor of North Carolina and resident of the area.

Geographically, Franklin Township occupies  in northwestern Surry County, with its northern border shared with the state of Virginia.  There are no incorporated municipalities within Franklin Township; however, there are several smaller, unincorporated communities located here, including Ladonia and Lowgap.  Most of Franklin Township is mountainous and features several of Surry County's most prominent peaks.

Townships in Surry County, North Carolina
Townships in North Carolina